Abrotanella inconspicua is a member of the daisy family and is found on Stewart Island and South Island of New Zealand.

References

Flora of New Zealand
inconspicua
Taxa named by Joseph Dalton Hooker